Ganei Tal was an Israeli settlement in the south of the Gaza Strip, located in the Gush Katif settlement bloc. It was under the jurisdiction of Hof Aza Regional Council.

History
Ganei Tal was established as a moshav in 1979 with a primarily agricultural purpose; exporting geraniums and tomatoes to Europe. It had a population of some 75 families, or 500 people.

Lined with stucco buildings and greenhouses, it sat next to the Palestinian city of Khan Yunis, which was the source of many rocket attacks against the settlement.

Unilateral disengagement
The residents of Ganei Tal were forcibly evicted from their homes on 17 August 2005 as part of the unilateral disengagement plan, decided on by the Israeli government in 2004. Their houses were destroyed once the evictions were complete. A new village called Ganei Tal was later established in central Israel by the former settlers.

Palestinian plans
In 2007, Hamas announced plans to build a "media city" on the site.

References

Former Israeli settlements in the Gaza Strip
Populated places established in 1979
Former moshavim
Religious Israeli settlements
Villages depopulated during the Arab–Israeli conflict
1979 establishments in the Israeli Military Governorate
2005 disestablishments in the Palestinian territories